Khur (also Romanized as Khūr or Khowr)  is a city and the capital of Khur and Biabanak County, Isfahan province, Iran. At the 2006 census, its population was 6,216, in 1,754 families.

References

Populated places in Khur and Biabanak County

Cities in Isfahan Province